is a Japanese women's professional shogi player ranked 4-dan.

Promotion history
Nagasawa's promotion history is as follows.
 2-kyū: August 1, 1979
 1-dan: February 26, 1980
 2-dan: April 7, 1994
 3-dan: May 22, 1989
 4-dan: April 1, 2000

Note: All ranks are women's professional ranks.

Titles and other championships
Nagasawa has appeared in women's major title matches twice, but has yet to win a major title. She was the challenger for the 6th  title in 1983 and the 11th Women's Meijin title in 1984, but lost each time. She has, however, won one non-major title women's tournament: the 9th  in 1995.

Awards and honors
Nagasawa received the Japan Shogi Association's received the "25 Years Service Award" in recognition of being an active professional for twenty-five years in 2004.

References

External links
 ShogiHub: Nagasawa, Chikako

Japanese shogi players
Living people
Women's professional shogi players
1964 births
People from Matsumoto, Nagano
Professional shogi players from Nagano Prefecture